Amaliada (Katharevousa: Ἀμαλιάς, Amaliás) is a town and a former municipality in northwestern Elis, West Greece, Greece. Since the 2011 local government reform it is part of the municipality Ilida, of which it is the seat and a municipal unit. The municipal unit has an area of 251.945 km2. In 2011, the municipal unit had 28,520 inhabitants, of whom 16,763 lived in the town of Amaliada. It is near the archaeological site of Elis, the city-state whose territory was the site of the ancient Olympic Games. It is situated in the plains of Elis, 6 km from the Ionian Sea. It is 10 km southeast of Gastouni, 16 km northwest of Pyrgos and 60 km southwest of Patras.

Amaliada was named after Queen Amalia of Greece in the 1830s, and formed by merging two communes, Kalitsa and Dervitselepi. It features a city square with pine trees and a fountain. Most of the streets are in grid order running almost due north, south, east, and west. On the east side, Amaliada has a public sports stadium (mainly used for soccer). The hospital and the monastery of Frangavilla are in the southeast. Amaliada has a train station on the line from Patras to Pyrgos. A street in Amaliada's west side is named Hiroshima in memory of the victims of the nuclear destruction of Hiroshima at the end of World War II. Kourouta and Palouki are the beaches of Amaliada, about 6 km southwest of the town centre.

Population history

Subdivisions
The municipal unit Amaliada is subdivided into the following communities (constituent villages in brackets):
Agios Dimitrios (Agios Dimitrios, Kolokythas)
Agios Ilias
Amaliada (Amaliada, Agios Ioannis, Kourouta, Marathea, Palouki, Panagia, Tsafleika, Tsichleika)
Ampelokampos
Archaia Ilida
Avgeio
Chavari (Chavari, Agios Georgios, Pera Chavari)
Dafni (Dafni, Kalathas)
Dafniotissa
Douneika (Douneika, Agia Marina, Danika, Kato Kertezaiika)
Geraki (Geraki, Analipsi)
Kalyvia Ilidos
Kardamas (Kardamas, Petroules)
Kentro
Keramidia
Kryonero
Peristeri (Peristeri, Asteraiika, Palaiolanthi)
Roviata (Roviata, Kasidiaris, Paralia, Romeika)
Savalia
Sosti

Sporting teams
Amaliada is the seat of Koroivos which plays in A1 Ethniki. The town also hosts the football team Asteras Amaliada F.C. with earlier presence in Gamma Ethniki.

Notable people 
Nikos Beloyannis (1915–1952), communist and resistance leader
Mitsos Alexandropoulos (1924-2008), writer
Yovanna (1940- ), singer and author
Angeliki Skarlatou (1973- ), sailor
Rallis (1994- ), Airman

Twin towns — sister cities
Amaliada is twinned with:
 Edremit, Turkey since 2000

See also
Kourouta
List of settlements in Elis

References

External links

GTP - Municipality of Amaliada
GTP - Amaliada

 
Populated places in Elis